Miroslav Grujičić (born 17 June 1994) is a Serbian football goalkeeper who plays for KFC Komárno in the 2. Liga.

Honours
Radnik Surdulica
Serbian First League: 2014–15

References

External links
 
 Miroslav Grujičić stats at utakmica.rs

1994 births
Living people
Footballers from Belgrade
Association football goalkeepers
Serbian footballers
Serbia youth international footballers
FK BSK Borča players
FK Teleoptik players
FK Srem Jakovo players
FK Radnik Surdulica players
MŠK Novohrad Lučenec players
KFC Komárno players
Serbian SuperLiga players
Serbian First League players
3. Liga (Slovakia) players
2. Liga (Slovakia) players
Expatriate footballers in Slovakia
Serbian expatriate sportspeople in Slovakia